Poonam Dhillon is an Indian actress and politician. A former Femina Miss India (1977), she is best known for her 1979 film Noorie. Some of her well-known films include Red Rose (1980), Dard (1981), Romance (1983), Sohni Mahiwal (1984),  Teri Meherbaniyan (1985) Samundar (1986), Saveraywali Gaadi (1986), Karma (1986), Naam (1986) and Maalamaal (1988).

Dhillon participated in Bigg Boss in 2009. She played the lead role of Sharda Modi in the Sony TV series Ekk Nayi Pehchaan in 2013. She has done theatre, starting with the award-winning "The Perfect Husband" and many other plays, the latest being "The Perfect Wife" with several shows in United States and Dubai.

Career

The first time Dhillon gained fame was when she got crowned Miss Young India 1978 at the age of 16.

Director Yash Chopra noticed her and offered her a role in the film Trishul (1978) where her song "Gapoochi Gapoochi Gum Gum" with Sachin Pilgaonkar became popular. Chopra then gave her the title role in Noorie (1979) opposite Farooq Shaikh, which he produced. The low budget film Noorie shot in Bhaderwah, Kashmir, became a superhit and was a phenomenal success at the box office, partly also for Khayyam's music. For this film, Poonam was nominated for the Filmfare Award for Best Actress.

Subsequently, she went on to act in around 90 films in Hindi, including Sohni Mahiwal, Red Rose, Teri Kasam, Dard, Nishana, Yeh Vaada Raha, Samunder, Romance, Kasam, and Sitamgar. She was paired with Rajesh Khanna in six films: Dard, Nishaan, Zamana, Awam, Red Rose (1980 film) and Jai Shiv Shankar. She made a special appearance in Judaai as a favour to producer Boney Kapoor when Juhi Chawla had to drop out.

She also appeared in regional films such as Nyay Danda (Bengali), Yuddha Kaanda (Kannada), Ishtam (Telugu) and Yavarum Nalam (Tamil), 13B: Fear Has a New Address (Hindi).

Dhillon was a contestant on Season 3 of Bigg Boss aired on Colors TV in 2009. She ended up as the second runner-up on the show. Her big comeback on Indian television in a lead role was with the serial Ekk Nayi Pehchaan on Sony TV in 2013 where she played the uneducated yet ideal wife of a rich businessman.

She has been in the Hindi theater production The Perfect Husband, which won the best comedy play award in 2005 and which completed a Golden jubilee run. She then did another play The Perfect Wife co-starring Sooraj Thapar and Pyaar Mein Kabhi Kabhi with Asif Sheikh. She was also seen in a play called U Turn which is the Hindi version of a Marathi play.

Dhillon ventured into the make-up van business, pioneering the concept in the Indian film industry. She runs a make-up van company called "Vanity."

Personal life 
Dhillon was born in Kanpur, Uttar Pradesh. Her father Amreek Singh was an aeronautical engineer in the Indian Air Force and would often get transferred. Her mother was a school principal and both her siblings are doctors. Poonam was quite studious growing up and aspired to become a doctor. Poonam attended Carmel Convent in [Chandigarh] for schooling and did her graduation after joining films at age 16.

In 2013, she was pursuing an MBA in International Business. Dhillon was married to producer Ashok Thakeria and has two children, a daughter Paloma and a son Anmol.

Activism and politics 
She has been very active with social causes like drug awareness, AIDS awareness, family planning and organ donation.

She has been a prominent speaker at the SAARC business summits in Kathmandu and Delhi and was appointed cultural ambassador. She was also a speaker at the MINDMINE event. In 2012, she along with other celebrities participated in a show supporting the "Save and Empower the Girl Child" cause in collaboration with Lilavati Hospital.

In 2014, she launched an event management and film production company called "Poetic Justice Films and Entertainment Pvt. Ltd." with industrialist Aneel Murarka and choreographer Samir Tanna.

In 2017, Dhillon was appointed as one of four members to the Film Certification Appellate Tribunal, which is the official body for appeals against decisions of the Central Board of Film Certification in the Indian film industry.

Dhillon joined the Bhartiya Janta Party in 2004 and was appointed Vice President of the Mumbai unit of the party in 2019.

Filmography

Films

Television

Accolades

References

External links

 
 
 

Year of birth missing (living people)
Living people
Indian film actresses
Actresses in Hindi cinema
Actresses in Hindi television
Indian stage actresses
Indian television actresses
Indian soap opera actresses
Punjabi people
People from Kanpur
Actresses from Uttar Pradesh
20th-century Indian actresses
21st-century Indian actresses
Bigg Boss (Hindi TV series) contestants
Bharatiya Janata Party politicians from Maharashtra